The 2013–14 Croatian Women's First Football League (Prva hrvatska nogometna liga za žene) was the twenty-third season of Croatian Women's First Football League, the national championship for women's association football teams in Croatia, since its establishment in 1992.

The league was contested by 8 teams. ŽNK Osijek were the defending champions, having won their seventeenth title in 2012–13.

League table

Results

First round

Second round

Top goalscorers
The top scorers in the 2013–14 Prva HNLŽ season were:

References

External links
Croatian Women's First Football League at UEFA.com

Croatian Women's First Football League seasons
Croatia
women
Football
Football